KhaDarel Hodge (born January 3, 1995) is an American football wide receiver for the Atlanta Falcons of the National Football League (NFL). He played college football at Prairie View A&M.

Early years and high school career
Hodge was born in D'Lo, Mississippi and raised there with three siblings by a single mother, Michelle Hodge, and by his grandfather, who is a preacher. Hodge attended and played high school football at Mendenhall High School.  Hodge became the starting quarterback at Mendenhall during his sophomore season and threw for over 3,000 passing yards and ran for over 2,000 yards along with 68 total touchdowns during his junior and senior seasons. He was named second-team All-State his senior season.

College career
Hodge began his career as a quarterback at Alcorn State but left after one year, during which he redshirted. He then went to Hinds Community College, where he transitioned to wide receiver, for one season before moving on to Prairie View A&M. Hodge played three seasons for the Panthers, catching 104 passes for 1,797 yards and 21 touchdowns. As a senior, Hodge had 48 receptions for 844 yards and 12 touchdowns and was named first-team All-SWAC and Black  College All-America.

Professional career

Los Angeles Rams
Hodge signed with the Los Angeles Rams as an undrafted free agent on July 24, 2018 after participating in a tryout. He was cut by the Rams at the end of training camp on September 1 and was subsequently signed to their practice squad the following day. Hodge was promoted to the active roster on September 19. Hodge caught his first career pass, a 14-yard reception, on October 7 against the Seattle Seahawks. Hodge played in 14 regular season games during his rookie season, catching two passes for 17 yards and making five tackles on special teams and one tackle in three postseason games, including Super Bowl LIII.

Hodge signed an exclusive rights contract with the Rams on March 12, 2019. He was waived during final roster cuts on August 31, 2019.

Cleveland Browns

Hodge was claimed off waivers by the Cleveland Browns on September 1, 2019. Hodge played in all 16 of the Browns games, catching four passes for 76 yards and led the team with 13 special teams tackles.

Hodge was tendered by the Browns for the 2020 season, and signed the one-year tender on April 16, 2020. Hodge was placed on injured reserve on October 6, 2020. Hodge was activated from injured reserve on October 31, 2020. He was placed on the reserve/COVID-19 list by the team on December 26, 2020, and activated on December 31. He was placed back on the COVID-19 list on January 5, 2021, and activated on January 14. Hodge finished the season with 11 receptions for 180 yards on 17 targets in nine games played.

The Browns placed a restricted free agent tender on Hodge on March 15, 2021, which he signed on May 26, 2021. Hodge was waived by the Browns on August 31, 2021.

Detroit Lions
Hodge was claimed off waivers by the Detroit Lions on September 1, 2021.

Atlanta Falcons
On March 25, 2022, Hodge signed with the Atlanta Falcons.

NFL career statistics

References

External links
Cleveland Browns bio
 Prairie View A&M Panthers bio

1995 births
Living people
American football wide receivers
Alcorn State Braves football players
People from Simpson County, Mississippi
Players of American football from Mississippi
Hinds Eagles football players
Prairie View A&M Panthers football players
Los Angeles Rams players
Cleveland Browns players
Detroit Lions players
Atlanta Falcons players